Here's to the Good Times is the debut studio album by American country music duo Florida Georgia Line. It was released on December 4, 2012, by Republic Nashville. The album includes the five tracks from their It'z Just What We Do EP, along with six new songs. The deluxe edition, titled Here's to the Good Times… This Is How We Roll, was released on November 25, 2013. The album was the sixth best-selling album of 2013 in the United States, and became certified two-times platinum by the Recording Industry Association of America (RIAA) on July 1, 2014.

Critical reception

Here's to the Good Times has received generally positive reviews by music critics. Robert Silva of About.com found that the album "may not be built to last, but it's built to be blast." Allmusic's Steve Leggett told that the release is "based on summer energy, drinking beer, taking shots, driving back roads, and the romantic glories and possibilities of Friday and Saturday nights with nothing to do but look for those good times." At Music Is My Oxygen Weekly, Rob Burkhardt evoked that "Here’s To the Good Times is only going to add to Florida Georgia Line’s rapidly growing popularity." Matt Bjorke of Roughstock praised the album because "is chock full of hits", and said that "it's the work of a band who not only has captured an audience seemingly overnight but also has the potential to be the biggest duo in Country Music".

Commercial performance
The album debuted at No. 3 on the Billboard Top Country Albums, and No. 10 on the Billboard 200 with 63,000 copies sold in the United States.  The album eventually reached No. 1 on the Top Country Albums chart in June 2013.

The album was the sixth best-selling album of 2013 in the United States, with 1,350,000 copies sold for the year.  The album was certified double Platinum by the RIAA on July 1, 2014, and reached its 2 million sales mark in August 2014.  As of April 2017, the album has sold 2,367,400 copies in the US.

Track listing

 The Target bonus tracks were also included on the Target edition of Here's to the Good Times... This Is How We Roll as tracks 18 and 19.

Personnel

Florida Georgia Line
 Tyler Hubbard - vocals
 Brian Kelley - vocals

Additional Musicians
 Tom Beaupre - bass guitar
 Brian Bonds - electric guitar
 Sarah Buxton - duet vocals on "Dayum, Baby"
 Scott Cooke - bass guitar
 Wes Hightower - background vocals
 Jaren Johnston - background vocals on "Party People"
 Charlie Judge - keyboards
 Joey Moi - acoustic guitar, electric guitar, programming, background vocals
 Russ Pahl - pedal steel guitar
 Mike Rojas - keyboards
 Jason Schmidt - percussion
 Adam Shoenfeld - electric guitar
 Jimmie Lee Sloas - bass guitar
 Chris Tompkins - keyboards
 Ilya Toshinsky - banjo, dobro, acoustic guitar, electric guitar, baritone guitar, mandolin
 Ryan Vikedal - percussion 
 John Willis - talk box guitar

Chart performance

Album
Weekly charts

Year-end charts

Decade-end charts

Singles

Certifications

Other charted songs

References

2012 debut albums
Florida Georgia Line albums
Republic Records albums
Albums produced by Joey Moi
Canadian Country Music Association Top Selling Album albums